Archaphanostoma is a genus of acoels belonging to the family Isodiametridae.

The species of this genus are found in Northern Europe.

Species

Species:

Archaphanostoma agile 
Archaphanostoma fontaneti 
Archaphanostoma histobursalis

References

Acoelomorphs